Fort Saskatchewan was incorporated as a village in 1899, a town in 1904, and a city in 1985. It elects its mayors separately from its Councillors. Since its incorporation as a town in 1904, 30 residents have served as Mayor.

References 

Fort Saskatchewan